"Falling Down" is a single by English band Duran Duran from their 2007 album Red Carpet Massacre, which was sent to radio and made available to download from iTunes USA on . It was recorded in two sessions in Blueprint Studios, Manchester and Sarm Studios, London. It is the only song on the album produced solely by Justin Timberlake and the band. All other songs are produced by Danja and Timbaland.

According to the band's official website, the single wasn't released on CD in the USA, due to the decline of physical singles being released in the US over passing time.

The single was the band's last to be released on Epic Records.

About the song
In 2021, Britney Spears's conservatorship battle became front and center in the public eye, and many learned that while Spears was facing one of her most traumatic years in the press back in 2007, Justin Timberlake was probing his ex's mental health issues in this song. Duran Duran confirmed "Falling Down" was about Spears in multiple interviews back in 2007 and 2008. In an interview in October 2007, main songwriter and keyboardist Nick Rhodes called "Falling Down" a satirical, social, pop-cultural commentary. Asked if Kate Moss served as inspiration, Nick Rhodes added: “She doesn’t appear in the video, but she and Lindsay and Britney and Amy have all provided us with inspiration." Drummer Roger Taylor, confirmed that the song was loosely based on Spears. "I suppose it's loosely based on her, but not [only] on one celebrity – just celebrity culture in general," Roger Taylor said of the song and video while speaking with People.

Music video
The music video for "Falling Down" centres around models in rehab with the members of Duran Duran acting as doctors and therapists, wearing white suits and thick glasses, counselling a group of the models and passing round pills. The band has publicly stated that pop star Britney Spears served as inspiration for the main character in the music video. Lead singer Simon Le Bon said that he hadn't spoken to Justin Timberlake about the video after its release, but assumed he would be pleased. "I haven’t spoken to him since the video has been made public," Le Bon said, "But he likes his pretty girls, so he probably would like it." He also commented on Spears's mental health issues which were also ongoing at the time. "I just wish she could accept help," Le Bon added. 

Apart from the MTV-friendly version, an "R-rated" version featuring topless models was also made (though this version has yet to appear). It was shot in Los Angeles and directed by Anthony Mandler who also did the video for The Killers' "When You Were Young". Models Allie Crandell and Tatiana Kovylina starred in the video.

The music video premiered on 16 October on Yahoo! Music.

Charts
In the UK, the single charted at No. 52, the second worst-performing single in Duran Duran's history after "Someone Else Not Me". Contrarily, "Falling Down" was a surprise hit in Italy, where it peaked at No. 2.

Track listing

CD: Epic / 88697 19130 2 (UK) 
"Falling Down" – 5:42
"(Reach Up for The) Sunrise (Live)" – 3:26

CD: Epic / (US promo) 
"Falling Down (Radio Edit)" – 3:40
"Falling Down (Extended Version)" – 5:42

CD: Epic 8-track promo (UK) 
 "Falling Down (Sebastian Leger Vocal Mix)" – 7:25
 "Falling Down (Sebastian Leger Dub)" – 6:14
 "Falling Down (T-empo Main Mix)" – 7:36
 "Falling Down (Freeks Main Mix)" – 7:12
 "Falling Down (Ashanti Boys Main Mix)" – 6:03
 "Falling Down (Freeks Instrumental)" – 7:12
 "Falling Down (Sebastian Leger Radio Mix)" – 3:48
 "Falling Down (Original Version)(Radio Edit)" – 3:40

CD: Epic 8-track promo (US) 
 "Falling Down (Single Edit)" – 3:40
 "Falling Down (Album Version)" – 5:42
 "Falling Down (Ashanti Boys Main Mix)" – 6:03
 "Falling Down (Freeks Main Mix)" – 7:12
 "Falling Down (Sebastian Leger Vocal Mix)" – 3:48
 "Falling Down (Freeks Instrumental)" – 7:12
 "Falling Down (Sebastian Leger Dub)" – 6:14
 "Falling Down (Jeff Barringer Mix)" – 3:44

Additional personnel
Justin Timberlake – producer, background vocals
Jean-Marie Horvat – mixer
Dom Brown – guitars

Footnotes

2007 singles
Duran Duran songs
Music videos directed by Anthony Mandler
Songs written by Simon Le Bon
Songs written by John Taylor (bass guitarist)
Songs written by Roger Taylor (Duran Duran drummer)
Songs written by Andy Taylor (guitarist)
Songs written by Nick Rhodes
Songs written by Justin Timberlake
2007 songs
Epic Records singles